Joseph Dessertine (4 October 1920 – 23 July 2005) was a French racing cyclist. He rode in the 1947 Tour de France.

References

External links
 

1920 births
2005 deaths
French male cyclists
Sportspeople from Loire (department)
Cyclists from Auvergne-Rhône-Alpes